The 2000 Tour de Corse (formally the 44th V-Rally Tour de Corse - Rallye de France) was the 11th round of the 2000 World Rally Championship. The race was held over three days between 29 September and 1 October 2000. Peugeot's Gilles Panizzi won the race, his 1st win in the World Rally Championship.

Results

References

External links 
 Results at ewrc-results.com

Tour de Corse
Tour de Corse
Tour de Corse
Tour de Corse